Crossford is a village in South Lanarkshire, Scotland.

It is home to a pub, the Tillietudlem Inn, and a village shop. The nearest primary school, Underbank Primary, is situated just out of Crossford whilst the nearest secondary is in Carluke, though pupils from the village attend Lanark Grammar School.
The 317 bus service runs every 90 minutes to Hamilton and Lanark.
The 40-mile long Clyde walkway footpath from Lanark to Glasgow passes through Crossford.

References

External links

Villages in South Lanarkshire